The 1727 Tabriz earthquake occurred on 18 November with an epicenter near Tabriz in northwest Iran. The maximum felt intensity was VIII (Severe) on the Mercalli intensity scale, and there were an estimated 77,000 deaths. The only record for this earthquake comes from an account written in 1821 and it is very likely that the information for this earthquake refers instead to the 1721 Tabriz earthquake.

See also
List of earthquakes in Iran
List of historical earthquakes

References

Earthquakes in Iran
Tabriz Earthquake, 1727
1727 in Iran
1727 in Asia
History of Tabriz
History of East Azerbaijan Province
1727 disasters in Asia